Edith is a feminine given name derived from the Old English words ēad, meaning 'riches or blessed', and is in common usage in this form in English, German, many Scandinavian languages and Dutch. Its French form is Édith. Contractions and variations of this name include Ditte, Dita, and Edie.

It was a common first name prior to the 16th century, when it fell out of favour. It became popular again at the beginning of the 19th century, and in 2016 it was ranked at 488th most popular female name in the United States, according to the Social Security online database. It became far less common as a name for children by the late 20th century.

The name Edith has five name days: May 14 in Estonia, January 13 in the Czech Republic, October 31 in Sweden, July 5 in Latvia, and September 16 in France, Hungary, Poland and Lithuania.

Edith 

Edith of Polesworth (died c. 960), abbess
Edith of Wessex (1025–1075), Queen of England
Edith of Wilton (961–984), English nun
Edith the Fair (1025–1086), first wife or mistress of King Harold II of England
Edith Abbott (1876–1957), American economist
Edith Vosburgh Alvord (1875–1962), American suffragist
Edith Archibald (1854–1936), Canadian suffragist
Edith Baird (1859–1924), American chess composer
Edith Bideau (1888–1958), American soprano, music educator
Edith von Bonsdorff, (1890–1968) Danish-Finnish ballerina and choreographer
Edith Bouvier Beale (1917–2002), American socialite and cousin of Jacqueline Kennedy
Edith Ewing Bouvier Beale (1895–1977), American socialite and aunt of Jacqueline Kennedy
Edith Bosch (born 1980), Dutch judoka
Edith Bowman (born 1974), British television and radio presenter
Edith Cavell (1865–1915), British nurse
Edith Mellado Céspedes (b. 1938), Peruvian politician and educator
Edith Brown Clement (born 1948), American judge
Edith Clements (1874–1971), American botanist
Edith Cowan (1861–1932), Australian politician and member of parliament
Édith Cresson (born 1934), French politician and prime minister
Edith Dimock (1876–1955), American painter
Edith Durham (1863–1944), British writer and anthropologist
Edith Eaton (1865–1914), Canadian writer
Edith Efron (1922–2001), American journalist
Edith Ellis (1861–1916), British writer
Edith Evans (1888–1976), British actress
Edith Falco (born 1963), better known as Edie Falco, American actress
Edith Fisch (1923–2006), American jurist and legal scholar
Edith Flagg (1919–2014), American fashion designer
Edith M. Flanigen (born 1929), American chemist
Edith Willis Linn Forbes (1865–1945), American poet and writer
Edith Frank (1900–1945), German mother of diarist and Holocaust victim Anne Frank
Edith González (1964–2019), Mexican actress
Edith Green (1910–1987), American politician and congresswoman
Edith Julia Griswold (1863-1926), American lawyer and patent expert
Edith Grossman (born 1936), American literary translator
Edith Hacon (1875–1952), Scottish suffragist from Dornoch, a World War One nursing volunteer, as well as an international socialite
Edith Halpert (1900–1970), American art dealer
Edith Hamilton (1867–1963) American classicist and educator
Edith Head (1897–1981), American costume designer
Edith Heath (1911–2005), American studio potter
Edith Henderson (1911–2005), American landscape architect
Edith Heraud (died 1899), English actress
Edith Hermansen (1907–1988), Danish film actress
Edith Holden (1871–1920), British artist and teacher
Edith Howes (1872–1954), New Zealand writer
Edith Jacobson (1897–1978), German psychoanalyst
Edith Jones (born 1949), American judge
Edith Katiji, known professionally as Edith WeUtonga, (born 1979), Zimbabwean musician
Edith Kellnhauser (1933–2019), nursing scientist, educator, and writer
Edith Balfour Lyttelton (1865–1948), British novelist
Edith Hyde Robbins Macartney (1895–1978), first "Miss America"
Edith Massey (1918–1984), American actress and singer
Edith Master (1932–2013), American equestrian
Edith Mathis (born 1938), Swiss soprano
Edith May (pseudonym of Anne Drinker; 1827–1903), American poet
Edith McAlinden (born 1968), Scottish murderer
Edith Kawelohea McKinzie (1925–2014), Hawaiian author, genealogist, and traditional hula expert.
Edith Maryon (1872–1924), English sculptor
Edith Morley (1875–1964), British literary scholar
Edith Nesbit (1858–1924), British writer
Edith Northman (1893–1956), American architect
Edith Olivier (1872–1948), British writer
Edith MacQueen (1900–1977), Scottish historian
Edith Marion Patch (1876–1954), American entomologist
Edith Pechey (1845–1908), British doctor and suffragette
Edith Penrose (1914–1996), British economist
Edith Philips, American writer and educator
Édith Piaf (1915–1963), French singer
Edith Pitt (1906–1966), British politician
Edith Quimby (1891–1982), American medical researcher
Edith Ramirez (born 1967), American lawyer and chair of the Federal Trade Commission
Edith Roosevelt (1861–1948), American first lady and wife of Theodore Roosevelt
Edith S. Sampson (1898–1979), American judge and diplomat
Edith Schippers (born 1964), Dutch politician
Édith Scob (born 1937), French actress
Edie Sedgwick (1943–1971), born Edith Minturn Sedgwick, American model and actress
Edith Sitwell (1887–1964), British poet and critic
Edith Södergran (1892–1923), Finnish poet
Edith Somerville (1858–1949), Irish novelist
Edith Stein (1891–1942), German philosopher and nun
Edith Summerskill (1901–1980), British politician
Edith Sutton (1862–1957), first woman councillor in England, Mayor of Reading and suffragist
Edith Thompson (1893–1923), English murderer
Edith Thompson (historian), historian and lexicographer
Edith Unnerstad (1900–1982), Swedish author
Edith Wall (1904–2012), New Zealand/Australian artist
Edith Wharton (1862–1937), American writer
Edith Wilson (1872–1961), American first lady and wife of Woodrow Wilson
Edith Windsor (1929–2017), LGBTQ+ Rights Advocate

Édith 

 Édith Audibert (born 1948), French politician
 Édith Cresson (born 1934), French politician
 Édith Girard (1949–2014), French architect
 Édith Piaf (1915–1963), French singer-songwriter, cabaret performer and film actress
 Édith Scob (1937–2019), French film and theatre actress
 Édith Thomas (1909–1970), French novelist, archivist, historian and journalist

Translations 

Old English: Eadgyth (Also spelled "Ædgyth")
Albanian: Edita
Czech: Edita
Finnish: Eedit
French: Edith/Edyth
Hawaiian: Ekika
Hebrew: Idit/ עידית
Hungarian: Edit
Italian: Editta
Latvian: Edīte
Lithuanian: Edita
Polish: Edyta
Portuguese: Edith/Edite
Serbian: Edita/Едита
Slovak: Edita
Spanish: Edit
Swedish: Edith/Edit
Tongan: Iteti

See also
Eadgyth (disambiguation)
Ealdgyth
Edythe (disambiguation)

References 

 Behind The Name
 Etymology Online
 United States Social Security Database

English feminine given names
German feminine given names
Lists of people by given name
Old English given names